Valérie Grace (born 1961 in Lille) is a French therapist and writer living and practicing in Paris. She writes on subjects of psychology, although she does not have a diploma to practice as a psychologist. Her works are intended for the general public. In July 2021, she was accused of practicing controversial conversion therapy in Paris.

Biography

Valérie Grumelin-Halimi studied human and social psychology and special education. On her return to Paris after pursuing her studies in psychology at the University of Jerusalem, she joined CESI for a course as a professional coach. She has undertaken at various points in her career, courses in waking dream technique, fasciatherapy and EMDR.

She initially created an association called Naître ensemble which helped conduct group therapies for future mothers to deal with their anxieties and questions. She was also involved in the creation of the association Tiens bon à tes rêves along with Charlotte Rampling, which was approved by the National Education ministry under the framework of APAC classes. The association worked with more than 7,000 children aged between 4 and 12, from more than 100 schools using art therapy to help them express themselves. This phase saw her writing her first book À tes rêves! T’es toi quand tu peins published by Les portes du monde, is a companion book and CD for children.

As her practice grew, she became more convinced that psychotherapy was not only for those seriously ill but for everyone. She believed that the body mirrored the state of mind of the person and that most people were likely victims of some form of trauma. This inspired her to write her first book Mon corps me dit, aimed at informing the general public how to interpret bodily signals to decode the underlying psychological cause. The book was published by editor Guy Trèdaniel in 2011.

Bibliography

 À tes rêves! T'es toi quand tu peins, 2002
 Mon corps me dit, 2011
 Je suis timide et je m'en sers, 2013
 My Body Tells No Lie, 2013

References

Sources
 Part 1, Programme Priorité Santé on 5 July 2011: Radio France International
 Part 2, Programme Priorité Santé on 5 July 2011: Radio France International

External links 
 

French psychologists
French women psychologists
French psychotherapists
French women writers
Living people
1961 births
Writers from Lille